Guryevsk is a town and the administrative center of Guryevsky District of Kaliningrad Oblast, Russia, located  northeast of Kaliningrad. Population:

History

In 1255 the Sambians tribe's stronghold of Vurgvala was taken by Teutonic Knights and renamed as Neuhausen in 1262. Around 1292, the Castle of the Sambian Chapter was built. In 1454, King Casimir IV Jagiellon incorporated the region to the Kingdom of Poland upon the request of the anti-Teutonic Prussian Confederation. After the subsequent Thirteen Years' War (1454–1466), it became a part of Poland as a fief held by the Teutonic Knights until 1525, and by secular Ducal Prussia afterwards. From 1701, the settlement was part of the Kingdom of Prussia, and in 1871 it became part of the German Empire upon the unification of Germany, within which it was administered as part of the Province of East Prussia. In 1877, the village had a population of 559, mostly employed in agriculture and cattle breeding. It was captured by Red Army on 28 January 1945.

After the end of World War II in 1945, the town was annexed by the Soviet Union. The remaining German population which had not been evacuated was subsequently expelled in accordance with the Potsdam Agreement and replaced with Russians. The following year it was renamed Guryevsk in honor of Stepan Guryev, a Soviet marshal who died during the capture of Kaliningrad.

Administrative and municipal status
Within the framework of administrative divisions, Guryevsk serves as the administrative center of Guryevsky District. As an administrative division, it is incorporated within Guryevsky District as the town of district significance of Guryevsk.

Within the framework of municipal divisions, since May 31, 2013, the territories of the town of district significance of Guryevsk and of seven rural okrugs of Guryevsky District are incorporated as Guryevsky Urban Okrug. Before that, the town of district significance was incorporated within Guryevsky Municipal District as Guryevskoye Urban Settlement.

Notable people
Martin Kähler (1835–1912), theologian

References

Notes

Sources

External links

Official website of Guryevsk  
Guryevsk Business Directory  

Cities and towns in Kaliningrad Oblast
Populated places in Guryevsky District, Kaliningrad Oblast
Castles of the Teutonic Knights